Those Barren Leaves is a satirical novel by Aldous Huxley, published in 1925. The title is derived from the poem "The Tables Turned" by William Wordsworth which ends with the words:
Enough of Science and of Art;
Close up those barren leaves;
Come forth, and bring with you a heart
That watches and receives.

Stripping the pretensions of those who claim  a spot among the cultural elite, it is the story of Mrs. Aldwinkle and her entourage, who are gathered in an Italian palace to relive the glories of the Renaissance. For all their supposed sophistication, they are nothing but sad and superficial individuals in the final analysis.

The work entered the public domain in the United States in 2021, but remains under copyright until 2034 in countries that follow the p.m.a 70-year rule.

References

External links
 
 

1925 British novels
Novels by Aldous Huxley
Satirical novels
Roman à clef novels
Novels set in Italy
Chatto & Windus books